Lockyer is a surname. Notable people with the surname include:

 Bill Lockyer (born 1941), American politician
 Charles Lockyer (died 1752), British politician
 Clifford Lockyer (born 1949), British businessman
 Dafydd Lockyer (born 1985), Welsh rugby union footballer
 Darren Lockyer (born 1977), Australian rugby league footballer
 Edmund Lockyer (1784–1860), British soldier and Australian explorer
 Edward Lockyer (1899–1958) Canadian businessman and politician
 Henry Frederick Lockyer (1797–1860), acting Governor of British Ceylon
 Herbert Lockyer (1886–1984), minister and biblical writer
 James E. Lockyer (born 1949), Canadian lawyer, politician
 James Lockyer (architect) (1796–1875), English architect
 James Lockyer (born 1949), Canadian lawyer and social justice activist
 Lionel Lockyer (c. 1600–1672), quack doctor
 Malcolm Lockyer (1923–1976), British film composer and conductor
 Nicholas Lockyer (public servant) (1855–1933), Australian public servant
 Nicholas Lockyer (1611–1685), English clergyman
 Nigel Lockyer (born 1952), particle physicist
 Norman Lockyer (1836–1920), English scientist and astronomer
 Paul Lockyer (1950–2011), Australian television journalist 
 Peter Lockyer, American actor and singer
 Phil Lockyer (born 1946), Australian politician
 Robert Lockyer (1625–1649), English soldier
 Roger Lockyer (1927–2017), English historian
 Tarkyn Lockyer (born 1979), Australian rules footballer
 Tom Lockyer (cricketer) (1826–1869), English cricketer
 Tom Lockyer (born 1994), Welsh professional footballer
 Will Lockyer (1875–1959), British politician and trade unionist
 William James Stewart Lockyer (1868–1936), English astronomer and physicist